Szügy is a village (1,349 inhabitants end 2014) and municipality of county Nógrád in northern Hungary. Slovak exonym: Sudice.

References

Populated places in Nógrád County